The 2017 Wartburg Knights football team represented Wartburg College as a member of the Iowa Intercollegiate Athletic Conference (IIAC) during the 2017 NCAA Division III football season. Led by Rick Willis in his 19th season as head coach, the Knights compiled an overall record of 12–1 with a mark of 8–0 in conference play, winning IIAC title for the first time since 2014 and earning an automatic bid to the NCAA Division III Football Championship playoffs. The team played home games at Walston-Hoover Stadium in Waverly, Iowa.

Schedule
Wartburg's 2017 regular season scheduled consisted of six home and four away games.

References

Wartburg
Wartburg Knights football seasons
Wartburg Knights football